Phymaspermum is a genus of African plants in the chamomile tribe within the daisy family.

 Species

References

Flora of Africa
Anthemideae
Asteraceae genera